Felixdorf is a railway station serving the town of Felixdorf in Lower Austria.

References 

Railway stations in Lower Austria
Austrian Federal Railways